St. Catherine's School, College or University may refer to:

Australia
St Catherine's School, Toorak, in Melbourne
St Catherine's School, Waverley, in Sydney

South Africa
St Catherine's School, in Empangeni, KwaZulu-Natal
St Catherine's Convent School, in Florida, Gauteng
St Catherine's School, Germiston, Gauteng

United Kingdom
St Catherine's Catholic High School, a secondary school in Halifax, West Yorkshire, England
St Catherine's Catholic School for Girls, a secondary school in Bexleyheath, London, England
St Catherine's College, Oxford, one of the constituent colleges of the University of Oxford, England
St Catharine's College, Cambridge, one of the constituent colleges of the University of Cambridge, England
St Catherine's School, Bramley, an independent girls' school in the village of Bramley, near Guildford, Surrey, England
St Catherine's School, Twickenham, an independent girls' school in Twickenham, London, England
St Catherine's School, Ventnor, a residential special school on the Isle of Wight, England
St Catherine's College, Armagh, in Armagh, Northern Ireland

United States
St. Catherine's Academy, in Anaheim, California
St. Catherine of Siena School (Martinez, California)
St. Catherine of Siena Church and School, Reseda, California
St. Catherine of Siena School (Vallejo, California)
St. Catharine College, near Springfield, Kentucky
St. Catherine of Siena School (Metairie, Louisiana)
St. Catherine University, in Saint Paul and Minneapolis, Minnesota
St. Catharine Academy, in the Bronx, New York
St. Catherine's Montessori School, in Houston, Texas
St. Catherine's School (Richmond, Virginia)
St. Catherine's High School (Racine, Wisconsin)

Other countries
St. Catherine College or Colégio Santa Catarina, in Novo Hamburgo, Rio Grande do Sul, Brazil
St. Catharine's School for Girls (Kwun Tong), in Hong Kong, China
St Catherine's College of Education for Home Economics, Dublin, Ireland
St. Catherine High School, in St Catherine, Jamaica
St. Catherine University (Japan), in Matsuyama, Ehime, Japan
St. Catharine's School for Girls (Kwun Tong), in Hong Kong
St Catherine's College, Wellington, in Kilbirnie, New Zealand
St Catherine's School, now St. Brendan, in Montevideo, Uruguay
Pontifical and Royal University of St. Catherine or University of Santa Catalina (1550–1841), in El Burgo de Osma, Spain
St. Catherine´s School, ahora Colegio San Gabriel Colonia, Uruguay

See also
 St. Catherine (disambiguation)
 St Katherine's School